Shine is the fourth studio album by hard rock band Shaman's Harvest. It was released on May 1, 2009.

History
Their first single, "Dragonfly", reached #34 on Billboard's Rock Songs chart. The single also peaked at #15 on the Billboard Mainstream Rock Tracks. The second single was "Shine".

Track listing

References

2009 albums
Shaman's Harvest albums